Theyer is a surname. Notable people with the surname include:
Hans Theyer, (1884–1955), Austrian cinematographer
Hans Heinz Theyer (1910–1961), Austrian cinematographer
John Theyer, (1597–1673), English royalist lawyer, writer, antiquary and bibliophile

See also 
Thayer (name)
Theys (surname)

Surnames of Austrian origin
Surnames of English origin